Neolamprologus modestus is a species of cichlid endemic to Lake Tanganyika where it lives on rocky substrates in the southern portion of the lake.  It breeds in areas with sandy substrates.  Generally eating small snails, it also specializes on eating the eggs of Lamprichthys tanganicanus, a species of killifish. Males of this species can reach a length of  TL while the females only grow to  TL.  This species can also be found in the aquarium trade.

References

modestus
Taxa named by George Albert Boulenger
Fish described in 1898
Taxonomy articles created by Polbot